Mutikha is a rural locality (a settlement) in Krasnovishersky District, Perm Krai, Russia. The population was 147 as of 2010. There are 6 streets.

Geography 
Mutikha is located 60 km east of Krasnovishersk (the district's administrative centre) by road. Akchim is the nearest rural locality.

References 

Rural localities in Krasnovishersky District